Borat's Television Programme is a two-part compilation spin-off of Da Ali G Show by British television station Channel 4. The show features Borat Sagdiyev  in the United States learning about the local culture and customs, much in the vein of the later movie Borat: Cultural Learnings of America for Make Benefit Glorious Nation of Kazakhstan. The two episodes contain Borat and Brüno segments from Ali G in da USA, along with new and unseen interviews and shenanigans.

Episodes

Both episodes were repeated on 1 November 2006 on Channel 4 in preparation for the film's release on 3 November 2006.

References

Channel 4 comedy